Noval is a surname. Notable people with the surname include:

Benjamín Noval (born 1979), Spanish bicycle racer
Luis Martínez Noval (1948–2013), Spanish economist and politician
Tomás Noval (1914–1981), Cuban baseball player

See also
Koval (surname)
Novak